Black Magic Man is a live album by multi-instrumentalist and composer Joe McPhee recorded on December 12, 1970 and was the first album released on the  Swiss HatHut label in 1975. It was included, in a heavily extended form, on the "Nation Time" 4-CD box set issued by Corbett vs. Dempsey.

Reception

The Allmusic review by Brian Olewnick states "Black Magic Man evinces a McPhee coming very much out of the ecstatic free jazz of the time (especially the late John Coltrane and Albert Ayler) but also wrestling with the implications of rock and the use of electronic instruments in jazz".

Track listing 
All compositions by Joe McPhee
 "Black Magic Man" - 9:30		
 "Song for Laureen" - 9:25		
 "Hymn of the Dragon Kings" - 17:10

Personnel 
Joe McPhee - tenor saxophone, soprano saxophone
Mike Kull - piano, electric piano
Tyrone Crabb - bass, electric bass
Bruce Thompson, Ernest Bostic - percussion

References 

Joe McPhee live albums
1975 live albums
Hathut Records live albums